Geiseler is a surname. Notable people with the surname include:

Christoph A. Geiseler (born 1981), American filmmaker and musician
Eduard Ferdinand Geiseler (1781–1827), German botanist

See also
Geissler (disambiguation)
Geiszler